Sir James Cockle (1819–1895) was an English lawyer and mathematician.

James Cockle may also refer to:

 James Cockle (surgeon) (1782–1854), his father, British surgeon
 James Cockle (speedway rider) (born 1986), professional speedway rider